General Sir Arthur Grenfell Wauchope  (1 March 1874 – 14 September 1947) was a British soldier and colonial administrator.

Military career
Educated at Repton School, Wauchope was commissioned into the Argyll and Sutherland Highlanders in 1893. He transferred to the 2nd Battalion Black Watch in January 1896.

He served in the Second Boer War in South Africa from 1899, and took part in operations in Cape Colony, south of Orange River. British forces advancing north from the Cape to relieve the town of Kimberley, which was sieged by Boer forces, met heavy resistance in the Battle of Magersfontein on 11 December 1899. Wauchope was severely wounded in the battle, and was later mentioned in despatches and appointed a Companion of the Distinguished Service Order (DSO) for his services.

In April 1902 he was seconded for a Staff appointment, as an extra Aide de camp to Sir Walter Hely-Hutchinson, Governor and Commander-in-Chief of the Cape Colony.

He served in World War I as Commanding Officer of 2 Bn Black Watch in France and Mesopotamia. After the War he joined 2nd Silesian Brigade, part of the British Upper Silesian Force, in Germany. He became Military Member of an Overseas Delegation to Australia and New Zealand in 1923 and then Chief of the British Section of the Military Inter-Allied Commission of Control for Berlin in 1924. He was appointed General Officer Commanding 44th (Home Counties) Division in 1927 and GOC Northern Ireland District in 1929.

His last appointment was as High Commissioner and Commander-in-Chief for Palestine and Trans-Jordan in 1931. Wauchope's administration was generally sympathetic to Zionist aspirations. By 1941 the former chief immigration officer for the Mandate, Albert Montefiore Hyamson, could write in his book Palestine: A Policy that "the first four years of his [Wauchope's] term were the heyday of Zionist history in Palestine." Not only did immigration go up threefold (the Jewish population increased from 174,606 to 329,358), but Jews also increased their land holdings (in 1931 they increased their land holdings by 18,585 dunams or 4,646 acres, while in 1935 they increased them by 72,905), and finally Jewish business and commerce enjoyed an economic boom. He also promoted public works and civil engineering schemes but was regarded as lax at the early stages of the Arab rebellion. He retired in 1938.

References

|-

1874 births
1947 deaths
Military personnel from Edinburgh
British Army generals
People educated at Repton School
Black Watch officers
Argyll and Sutherland Highlanders officers
British Army personnel of the Second Boer War
British Army personnel of World War I
British High Commissioners of Palestine
Knights Grand Cross of the Order of the Bath
Knights Grand Cross of the Order of St Michael and St George
Companions of the Order of the Indian Empire
Companions of the Distinguished Service Order
British military personnel of the 1936–1939 Arab revolt in Palestine